The John Chapman Village Site is a prehistoric archaeological site located in the Apple River Valley south of Hanover, Illinois. The site includes a village area and a platform mound; the latter is the only known platform mound in the Apple River Valley. The village was occupied from roughly 1100 to 1250 A.D., toward the end of the Late Woodland period and the beginning of the Mississippian period; it is associated with a transitional phase between the two periods known as the Bennett Phase. Archaeologists have hypothesized that the site formed part of a trade network between Cahokia and settlements further north, such as Aztalan, as evidenced by the artifacts found at the site.

The site was added to the National Register of Historic Places on December 10, 2009.

References

Archaeological sites on the National Register of Historic Places in Illinois
National Register of Historic Places in Jo Daviess County, Illinois
Late Woodland period